The Legislative Assembly of Vladimir Oblast is the regional parliament of Vladimir Oblast, a federal subject of Russia. A total of 38 deputies are elected for five-year terms.

Elections

2018

References

Vladimir Oblast
Politics of Vladimir Oblast